Novanet is a multinational cloud communications company headquartered in Mumbai, India. Novanet services include a WebRTC-enabled Cloud Contact Center Solution and Optimized VoIP for small-to-medium size and enterprises across the globe. Novanet recently exhibited their WebRTC Enabled Cloud Contact Center

Products
Cloud Contact Center (C3): Powered by WebRTC technology, (C3) offers features like in-browser integration, click-2-call, live monitoring, etc.
Optimized VoIP:  Uses routing technology that dynamically chooses an optimum path to deliver consistent call quality over the Internet.

References

External links
 

Telecommunications companies of the United States
American companies established in 1999
Companies based in San Francisco
VoIP companies of the United States